"Give It Up or Turnit a Loose" is a funk song recorded by James Brown. Released as a single in 1969, the song was a #1 R&B hit and also made the top 20 pop singles chart. "Give It Up or Turnit a Loose" appeared as an instrumental on the Ain't It Funky (1970) album, removing Brown's vocals and adding guitar overdubs, while the vocal version was released on It's a New Day – Let a Man Come In (1970).

Recorded history

Brown recorded "Give It Up or Turnit a Loose" again with The J.B.'s for his 1970 live double album Sex Machine. Over five minutes long, this later recording used a substantially different instrumental arrangement, with an added organ riff and a florid bassline, as well as different lyrics. This version features Clyde Stubblefield on drum kit performing in tandem with congas. A remix of this recording by Tim Rogers appears on the 1986 compilation album In the Jungle Groove. The remixed version has been extensively sampled. A genuine live version of the song appears on the album Live at Chastain Park (rec. 1985, rel. 1988).

In 1974 Lyn Collins recorded the song, with Brown producing.

Dick Hyman recorded a synthesizer version of "Give It Up or Turnit a Loose" on his 1969 album The Age of Electronicus.

Charts

Personnel

1969 version
 James Brown - lead vocals

with the James Brown Orchestra:
 Waymon Reed – trumpet
 Richard "Kush" Griffith – trumpet
 Fred Wesley – trombone
 Alfred "Pee Wee" Ellis – alto saxophone
 Maceo Parker – tenor saxophone
 St. Clair Pinckney – baritone saxophone
 Jimmy Nolen – guitar
 Alphonso "Country" Kellum – guitar
 Charles Sherrell – bass
 Nate Jones – drums
 Chuck Kirkpatrick – recording engineer

References

External links
 [ Song Review] at Allmusic
 List of songs that sample "Give It Up or Turnit a Loose" 

1969 singles
1969 songs
James Brown songs
King Records (United States) singles